The 2012–13 Western Illinois Leathernecks men's basketball team represented Western Illinois University during the 2012–13 NCAA Division I men's basketball season. The Leathernecks, led by fifth year head coach Jim Molinari, played their home games at Western Hall and were members of The Summit League. They finished the season 22–9, 13–3 in Summit League play to claim a share of the regular season conference title. They advanced to the semifinals of The Summit League tournament where they lost to North Dakota State. They were invited to the 2013 College Basketball Invitational where they lost in the first round to Purdue.

Roster

Schedule

|-
!colspan=9| Exhibition

|-
!colspan=9| Regular season

|-
!colspan=9| 2013 The Summit League men's basketball tournament

|-
!colspan=9| 2013 College Basketball Invitational
|-

References

Western Illinois Leathernecks men's basketball seasons
Western Illinois
Western Illinois
Western Illinois Lethernecks men's basketball
Western Illinois Lethernecks men's basketball